Santa María de Villandás is one of 28 parishes (administrative divisions) in the municipality of Grado, within the province and autonomous community of Asturias, in northern Spain.

The population is 122 (INE 2007).

Villages and hamlets
La Cabaña
La Campusa
Capítulo
La Fueja
El Gorrión
Los Lodos
Puente de Seaza
Robledo
Rozallana
Santa María
Seaza
Villandás
Vío del Pedrouco
Vío del Pico

References

Parishes in Grado